The 2014 United States House of Representatives elections were held on November 4, 2014, in the middle of President Barack Obama's second term in office. Elections were held for all 435 seats of the House of Representatives, representing the 50 states. Elections were also held for the non-voting delegates from the District of Columbia and four of the five territories. The winners of these elections served in the 114th United States Congress, with seats apportioned among the states based on the 2010 United States census. 

The Republicans won 16 seats from Democrats, while three Republican-held seats turned Democratic. The Republicans achieved their largest majority in the House since 1928 due to a sizeable Republican wave. Combined with the Republican gains made in 2010, the total number of Democratic-held House seats lost under Barack Obama's presidency in midterm elections rose to 77 with these elections. This marked the highest number of House seats lost under a two-term president of the same party since Harry S. Truman. With 36.4% of eligible voters voting, the voter turnout was the lowest since 1942.

As of 2022, this is the last congressional election in which Democrats won a House seat in Nebraska, and the last time Republicans won a House seat in New Hampshire.

Results summary

Federal 

Source: Election Statistics – Office of the Clerk (does not include blank and over/under votes)

Per states

Maps

Voter demographics 

Source: CNN exit poll

Incumbents who retired 

Forty-one representatives retired from their seats.

Democrats
Sixteen Democrats (seventeen, including the delegate from the Virgin Islands) retired from their seats.
 : Ed Pastor: Retired
 : George Miller: Retired
 : Henry Waxman: Retired
 : Gloria Negrete McLeod: Retired to run for the San Bernardino County Board of Supervisors
 : Colleen Hanabusa: Retired to run for U.S. Senator
 : Bruce Braley: Retired to run for U.S. Senator
 : Mike Michaud: Retired to run for Governor of Maine
 : John Dingell: Retired
 : Gary Peters: Retired to run for U.S. Senator
 : Rush Holt Jr.: Retired
 : Carolyn McCarthy: Retired
 : Bill Owens: Retired
 : Mike McIntyre: Retired
 : Allyson Schwartz: Retired to run for Governor of Pennsylvania
 : Jim Matheson: Retired
 Virgin Islands: Donna Christian-Christensen: Retired to run for Governor of the Virgin Islands.
 : Jim Moran: Retired

Republicans
Twenty-five Republicans retired from their seats.
 : Spencer Bachus: Retired
 : Tim Griffin: Retired to run for Lieutenant Governor of Arkansas
 : Tom Cotton: Retired to run for U.S. Senator
 : Buck McKeon: Retired
 : Gary Miller: Retired
 : John B. T. Campbell III: Retired
 : Cory Gardner: Retired to run for U.S. Senator
 : Jack Kingston: Retired to run for U.S. Senator
 : Paul Broun: Retired to run for U.S. Senator
 : Phil Gingrey: Retired to run for U.S. Senator
 : Tom Latham: Retired
 : Bill Cassidy: Retired to run for U.S. Senator
 : Dave Camp: Retired
 : Mike Rogers: Retired
 : Michele Bachmann: Retired
 : Steve Daines: Retired to run for U.S. Senator
 : Jon Runyan: Retired
 : Howard Coble: Retired
 : James Lankford: Retired to run for U.S. Senator
 : Jim Gerlach: Retired
 : Steve Stockman: Retired to run for U.S. Senator
 : Frank Wolf: Retired
 : Doc Hastings: Retired
 : Shelley Moore Capito: Retired to run for U.S. Senator
 : Tom Petri: Retired

Incumbents defeated

In primary elections 
 : Vance McAllister (R) lost a Nonpartisan blanket primary to Jamie Mayo (D) and Ralph Abraham (R). Abraham then won the runoff. Republican hold.
 : John F. Tierney (D) lost renomination to Seth Moulton (D), who then won the general election. Democratic hold.
 : Kerry Bentivolio (R) lost renomination to David Trott (R), who then won the general election. Republican hold.
 : Ralph Hall (R), lost renomination to John Ratcliffe (R), who then won the general election. Republican hold.
 : Eric Cantor (R) lost renomination to Dave Brat (R), who then won the general election. Republican hold.

In the general election
Republicans had a net gain of nine seats, taken from Democrats.

Democrats 
Eleven Democrats (twelve, including the delegate from American Samoa) lost re-election to Republicans.
 : Ron Barber (D) lost to Martha McSally (R).
 : Joe Garcia (D) lost to Carlos Curbelo (R).
 : John Barrow (D) lost to Rick W. Allen (R).
 : Brad Schneider (D) lost to Bob Dold (R).
 : Bill Enyart (D) lost to Mike Bost (R).
 : Steven Horsford (D) lost to Cresent Hardy (R).
 : Carol Shea-Porter (D) lost to Frank Guinta (R).
 : Tim Bishop (D) lost to Lee Zeldin (R).
 : Dan Maffei (D) lost to John Katko (R).
 : Pete Gallego (D) lost to Will Hurd (R).
 : Nick Rahall (D) lost to Evan Jenkins (R).
 American Samoa: Eni Faleomavaega (D) lost to Amata Coleman Radewagen (R).

Republicans 
Two Republicans lost re-election to Democrats.
 : Steve Southerland (R) lost to Gwen Graham (D).
 : Lee Terry (R) lost to Brad Ashford (D).

Open seat gains
Republicans had a net gain of four seats previously held by Democrats.

Democratic to Republican 
Five open seats previously held by Democrats were won by Republicans.
 : Bruce Braley (D) retired to run for U.S. Senate. Seat won by Rod Blum (R).
 : Mike Michaud (D) retired to run for Governor of Maine. Seat won by Bruce Poliquin (R).
 : Bill Owens (D) retired. Seat won by Elise Stefanik (R).
 : Mike McIntyre (D) retired. Seat won by David Rouzer (R).
 : Jim Matheson (D) retired. Seat won by Mia Love (R).

Republican to Democratic 
One open seat previously held by a Republican was won by a Democrat.
 : Gary Miller (R) retired. Seat won by Pete Aguilar (D).

Closest races 
In forty-seven races, the margin of victory was less than 10%.

Election ratings

Special elections 

Five special elections were held in 2014.
 Two elections were held concurrent with the November elections. The winners received a seniority advantage over other freshmen, as their seniority starts on the day of the elections.
 Three elections were held separate from the November general elections.

Alabama

Alaska

Arizona

Arkansas

California

Colorado

Connecticut

Delaware

Florida

Georgia

Hawaii

Idaho

Illinois

Indiana

Iowa

Kansas

Kentucky

Louisiana

Maine

Maryland

Massachusetts

Michigan

Minnesota

Mississippi

Missouri

Montana

Nebraska

Nevada

New Hampshire

New Jersey

New Mexico

New York

North Carolina

North Dakota

Ohio

Oklahoma

Oregon

Pennsylvania

Rhode Island

South Carolina

South Dakota

Tennessee

Texas

Utah

Vermont

Virginia

Washington

West Virginia

Wisconsin

Wyoming

Non-voting delegates 

|-
! 
| N/A
| Eni Faleomavaega
| 
| 1988
|  | Incumbent lost re-election.New delegate elected.Republican gain.
| nowrap | 

|-
! 
|  | 
| Eleanor Holmes Norton
| 
| 1990
| Incumbent re-elected.
| nowrap | 

|-
! 
| N/A
| Madeleine Bordallo
| 
| 2002
| Incumbent re-elected.
| nowrap | 

|-
! 
| N/A
| Gregorio Sablan
|  | Independent
| 2008
| Incumbent re-elected.
| nowrap | 

|-
! 
| N/A
| Donna Christian-Christensen
| 
| 1996
|  | Incumbent retired to run for Governor of the U.S. Virgin Islands.New delegate elected.Democratic hold.
| nowrap | 

|}

See also 
 2014 United States elections
 2014 United States gubernatorial elections
 2014 United States Senate elections
 113th United States Congress
 114th United States Congress

Notes

References

External links 
 
 
 Candidates for U.S. Congress at Project Vote Smart
 U.S. House of Representatives from OurCampaigns.com
 Congressional Races in 2014 from Open Secrets (campaign contributions)
 Casualty List: 113th Congress (2013–2014) from Roll Call
 2014 National House Popular Vote Tracker from The Cook Political Report
Race ratings
 Ratings from The Cook Political Report
 Polls from Real Clear Politics
 Ratings from Rothenberg Political Report/Roll Call
 Ratings at Sabato's Crystal Ball

 
Elections United States House
Elections United States House
Elections United States House